Christian Vinge (born 4 November 1935) is a Swedish sailor. He competed in the Flying Dutchman event at the 1960 Summer Olympics.

References

External links
 

1935 births
Living people
Swedish male sailors (sport)
Olympic sailors of Sweden
Sailors at the 1960 Summer Olympics – Flying Dutchman